The Grind Date is the seventh studio album by American hip hop group De La Soul, released on October 5, 2004. The album was originally intended to be the final album of the Art Official Intelligence (AOI) trilogy, but as the album quickly changed focus, the group decided to put AOI III on hold and finish The Grind Date as a stand-alone work.

Music
The Grind Date is a notably brisker, and leaner work than the group's previous albums, and features a top-of-the-line array of production talents including the late J Dilla (who was part of A Tribe Called Quest's production unit, The Ummah), Madlib ("Shopping Bags (She Got From You)"), and 9th Wonder ("Church"). Producer Supa Dave West, who handled the majority of the AOI albums, also contributes five tracks to the album. "Rock Co.Kane Flow" featuring MF DOOM, was produced by Jake One, and sees Posdnuos addressing some recent trends in Hip hop with the line "Unlike them, we craft gems / so systematically inclined to pen lines / without sayin a producer's name, all over the track". The well received collaboration also brought attention to the then-unknown Jake One.

The album is light on guest appearances and features a total of four guest MCs, including Common. Unlike every De La Soul album before it, The Grind Date contains no skits at all, although a short musical prelude does precede the first song "The Future". The album's conceptual cover and sleeve booklet, based on a 2005 calendar, was designed by Morning Breath Inc.

In November 2014, The Grind Date was reissued by BMG Rights Management to commemorate the album's tenth anniversary.

Critical reception

The album met with a great deal of critical praise, as of February 25, 2008 according to Metacritic, the album has received an average critic score of 80%, based on 21 reviews, thus giving it the "generally favorable reviews" tag.

Pitchfork writer Jamin Warren praises the album writing, "The Grind Date brings together an unimaginable team of the underground's hottest producers and meshes their idiosyncrasies without dissidence." Steve Juon of RapReviews.com who rewarded the album with a perfect score wrote, "They were just waiting for the right time to kick precisely the right rhyme, so that "The Grind Date" would go down not just as an important date in rap history but in the pantheon of all musical endeavours since the dawn of mankind. It's that damn good."

De La Soul, previously known for their skits, gained a lot of support from Stylus Magazine writer Josh Drimmer who wrote, "The Grind Date is as notable for what it lacks—skits, filler, bullshit—than for what it has." Dan Filowitz of Lost At Sea also favored the no skits on The Grind Date, "The Grind Date is almost shockingly excellent. This is De La Soul at their most focused – no skits, no filler, no weird interludes." Fiore Raymond of Entertainment Weekly gave the album a B+ and called it "worth keeping", while Robert Christgau gave it a one-star honorable mention.

Despite generally favorable reviews and positivity towards their new style, especially in production, there were those who didn't praise it. Peter Relic of Rolling Stone wrote, "There's little personality and no surprises here..." and regards to the production "...Flavor Flav's rote shucking on "Come On Down" to Madlib's Chingy-type beat for "Shopping Bags.""

Pitchfork placed the album at number 31 on the "Top 50 Albums of 2004" list.

Track listing

Charts

References

External links
 

2004 albums
De La Soul albums
Sanctuary Records albums
Albums produced by 9th Wonder
Albums produced by J Dilla
Albums produced by Madlib
Albums produced by Jake One